Valen is a village in Kvinnherad municipality in Vestland county, Norway.  The village is located on the mainland coast overlooking the island of Halsnøy to the south.  The undersea Halsnøy Tunnel connects Halsnøy island to the mainland just to the west of Valen, in the neighboring village of Sunde.
 
The village has a shop, a kindergarten and primary school, and a mental hospital. There is also a horseback riding center, a marina, and Valen Church.

The village of Valen is grouped together with the neighboring village of Sunde by Statistics Norway which calls it the Sunde/Valen "urban area".

References

Villages in Vestland
Kvinnherad